Michelle Lynn Kline (born 8 November 1968) is a former American female speed skater. She competed at the 1992 Winter Olympics and 1994 Winter Olympics representing United States.

Just prior to the 1992 Winter Olympics (which was also her first Olympic event), she met with an accident in 1991 causing severe major injuries to her ribs and lungs along with other members when they were engaged in a trip from Chicago to Milwaukee. However, she recovered from the major injuries and was able to participate at the 1992 Winter Olympics.

References 

1968 births
Living people
American female speed skaters
Speed skaters at the 1992 Winter Olympics
Speed skaters at the 1994 Winter Olympics
Olympic speed skaters of the United States
People from Golden Valley, Minnesota
21st-century American women